Mbongwana Star is a band from Kinshasa, Congo. Of the seven members of the band, two of them (Coco Ngabali and Theo Nzonza) were among the founding members of Staff Benda Bilili.

The band is signed to the World Circuit label, on which they released their debut album, From Kinshasa, in 2015. The album received "universal acclaim" from critics, according to Metacritic.

References 

World Circuit (record label) artists
Democratic Republic of the Congo musical groups
Culture of Kinshasa